Cristian Yusset García Borrero (born 25 January 1995) is a Colombian footballer who plays as a defender. He is currently a free agent.

Career
García was part of Atlético Huila's 2013 squad. He appeared for the Categoría Primera A team in the Copa Colombia on 29 May versus fellow top tier club Once Caldas, he was substituted on as Atlético Huila lost 3–0.

Career statistics
.

References

External links

1995 births
Living people
Footballers from Cali
Colombian footballers
Association football defenders
Atlético Huila footballers